was a Japanese samurai of the early Edo period.  He was a retainer, senior advisor (karō), and senior deputy commander in the service of the Shimazu clan.

Early life
Hisataka was born into the fifth generation of the Shimazu family line, adopting 'Kabayama' as his surname in respect to the birch (樺, kaba)-covered mountaintop (山, yama) upon which his castle domain had been constructed.

Warrior
In 1609, Hisataka led military forces of the Shimazu clan against the Kingdom of Ryukyu. The Invasion of Ryukyu was successful.

See also 
 Hirata Masumune
 Kabayama Sukenori

References

1560 births
1634 deaths
Samurai
Shimazu clan
Karō